Ashley Township may refer to the following townships in the United States:

 Ashley Township, Washington County, Illinois
 Ashley Township, Stearns County, Minnesota